This is a list of all the mayors of Marburg in Germany since 1835.

Marburg